Jack Pitt (20 May 1920 – 17 August 2004) was a former professional footballer who spent the majority of his career at Bristol Rovers.
His testimonial match was at Bath on 13 August 1988  against Wimbledon.
Pitt spent more than 50 years at Bristol Rovers as a player, coach and groundsman. He was part of the half back line "Pitt, Warren and Sampson" that guided the Rovers to promotion to Division Two in 1953 and sustained them in their early years there. A hard tackling half-back, Jackie was known for his rivalry with Bristol City's equally tough defender, Ernie Peacock.
Jack Pitt gave his life to his beloved club Bristol Rovers. On 3 April 2021, Pitt was the sixth player to be inducted into the recently created Bristol Rovers Hall of Fame.

References

1920 births
2004 deaths
People from Willenhall
English footballers
Association football midfielders
Bath City F.C. players
Bristol Rovers F.C. players
West Bromwich Albion F.C. players